Druid is a hack and slash dungeon crawl developed by Electralyte Software and published by Firebird in 1986 for the Atari 8-bit family and Commodore 64. It was also ported to Amstrad CPC, ZX Spectrum, and by Nippon Dexter in 1988 for the MSX, although the MSX port was released in Japan only. Another Japanese port of Druid entitled  was made for the Famicom Disk System by Jaleco in 1988. The game was followed by Druid II: Enlightenment and Warlock: The Avenger.

Gameplay

Inspired by the arcade game Gauntlet, Druid is a fantasy-themed dungeon crawl where the player plays the part of Hasrinaxx, a druid who is trying to rid the world of the dark mage Acamantor and his army of demons. To do this, Hasrinaxx must travel through several levels.

The first level is a normal landscape, and the ones after that are underground, each one deeper than the previous. Each level is infested with various enemies such as ghosts, giant insects, witches, and the four demon princes. Hasrinaxx can shoot these enemies with three different weapons: water, fire, and electricity, but they all come in a finite supply and are not equally effective on all enemies. Using a Chaos spell will destroy all enemies in the player's vicinity as well as replenish energy. The four demon princes can only be defeated with a Chaos spell; common weapons are ineffective against them.

Hasrinaxx can also summon a golem to help him or turn invisible for a brief period. In both Atari 8-bit and Commodore 64 versions, a second player can take control of the golem using joystick port 2.

References

External links

Druid at Atari Mania

1986 video games
Amstrad CPC games
Atari 8-bit family games
Commodore 64 games
Video games about demons
Famicom Disk System games
Jaleco games
MSX games
Telecomsoft games
Video games about old age
Video games developed in the United Kingdom
Video games scored by Tsukasa Tawada
ZX Spectrum games